The 2022 Michigan Wolverines football team represented the University of Michigan in the East Division of the Big Ten Conference during the 2022 NCAA Division I FBS football season. Led by eighth-year head coach Jim Harbaugh, the Wolverines compiled an overall record of 12–0 in the regular season with a mark of 9–0 in conference play, winning the Big Ten East Division title for the second consecutive season. Michigan beat Purdue in the Big Ten Championship Game to repeat as conference champions. The Wolverines advanced to the College Football Playoff (CFP) for the second straight year, where they lost to TCU in the Fiesta Bowl for the CFP Semifinal on December 31.

Junior running back Blake Corum won the Chicago Tribune Silver Football, awarded to the best player from the Big Ten, and the Ameche–Dayne Running Back of the Year as the Big Ten's best running back. Graduate center Olusegun Oluwatimi, a transfer from the University of Virginia prior to the season, won the Outland Trophy as the nation's best interior lineman and the Rimington Trophy as the nation's best center. Senior defensive end Mike Morris was named the Smith–Brown Defensive Lineman of the Year as the Big Ten's top defensive lineman. Harbaugh was recognized as the Hayes–Schembechler Coach of the Year by the Big Ten. Corum and Oluwatimi were consensus selections to the 2022 College Football All-America Team. Michigan's offensive line was honored with the Joe Moore Award for second straight season.

Season highlights include:
 Sophomore J. J. McCarthy replaced senior Cade McNamara as the team's starting quarterback after the second game of the season. 
 The Wolverines rushed for 418 yards, their highest single-game total since 2016, in a 41–17 victory over No. 10 Penn State.
 Corum rushed for 177 yards in a 29–7 victory over Michigan State. Seven Michigan State players were suspended after a post-game assault on two Michigan players.
 Fifth-year placekicker Jake Moody kicked a game-winning field goal with nine seconds remaining in a 19–17 victory over Illinois on Senior Day. 
 The Wolverines had five explosive plays of 45 yards or more to defeat No. 2 Ohio State by a 45–23 score. It was Michigan's first victory at Ohio Stadium since 2000.
 Donovan Edwards rushed for 185 yards and received the most valuable player award as Michigan defeated Purdue in the Big Ten Championship Game.

The team's statistical leaders were McCarthy with 2,719 passing yards, 22 touchdown passes, 5 interceptions, and a 64.6% completion percentage; Corum with 1,463 rushing yards and 18 touchdowns on 247 carries; and graduate wide receiver Ronnie Bell with 62 catches for 889 receiving yards. Moody converted 29 of 35 field goal attempts and 60 of 60 kicks for point after touchdown and led the team with 147 points scored, which broke the previous program record of 138 points scored, set by Desmond Howard during his Heisman Trophy-winning campaign in 1991. Moody also set program records for field goals in a season (29), career field goals (66), career points scored (355), and longest field goal (59 yards). Morris had a team-high 7.5 quarterback sacks. Sophomore linebacker Junior Colson paced the team with 101 tackles. Edward rushed for 991 yards and 7 touchdowns on 140 carries, averaging 7.1 yards per rush, and had 18 receptions for 200 yards and 2 touchdowns through the air. Senior wide receiver Cornelius Johnson had a team-high six touchdown receptions.

The 2022 season was marred in controversy for the Wolverines, from multiple incidents from both players and the coaching staff. On October 7, defensive lineman Mazi Smith was arrested for illegally possessing a firearm without a license. The team elected not to punish Smith or address the incident, until Smith was charged with a felony two months later. Despite the charge, the university and team did not punish Smith. On October 26, running back Donovan Edwards shared anti-Semitic opinions on Twitter. The university and team did not address the issue, and Edwards would later call the retweet a “glitch”. After their October 29 game against Michigan State, defensive back Gemon Green was recorded taunting Michigan State players while following them into the tunnel, starting a brawl between the two teams. 

On January 5, Michigan received notice of NCAA violations, including a Level I violation, stemming from head coach Jim Harbaugh lying to or misleading investigators. On January 17, the public was made aware that co-offensive coordinator Matt Weiss had been suspended by the university, and was under investigation for alleged crimes on his computer at Schembechler Hall. Weiss also had his computer seized and home searched by authorities. Weiss was fired by the university in January 20.

Preseason

2021 season
The 2021 Michigan Wolverines football team compiled an 11–1 record in the regular season. This resulted in Michigan's first trip to the Big Ten Football Championship Game, where they beat the Iowa Hawkeyes by a score of 42–3. With this victory, Michigan secured its first Big Ten championship since 2004. The team earned a berth in the Orange Bowl and College Football Playoff, where they were defeated by the eventual national champion Georgia Bulldogs. The Wolverines ended the season ranked no. 3 in the country, their highest postseason ranking since 1997.

Coaching changes

Following the season, Michigan experienced a number of coaching changes. These changes included the following:

 On January 5, it was reported that defensive line coach Shaun Nua would be leaving Michigan after 3 seasons to join Lincoln Riley's staff at USC in the same role.  This was announced by USC on January 10. 

 On January 17, Michigan announced the hire of Mike Elston as the new defensive line coach, replacing Nua. Elston, a former Michigan player from 1993-1996, had spent the past 12 seasons on the staff at Notre Dame, most recently serving as the program's assistant head coach and defensive line coach. 

 On January 27, defensive coordinator Mike Macdonald left Michigan after one season to return to the Baltimore Ravens as their defensive coordinator. 

 On February 6, reports surfaced that offensive coordinator Josh Gattis would leave Michigan after 3 seasons for the same role at Miami. Miami officially announced the hire on February 9. 

 On February 9, Harbaugh and Michigan hired Jesse Minter to replace Macdonald as defensive coordinator. Minter had spent the 2021 season as the defensive coordinator at Vanderbilt and had spent 4 seasons previously with the Baltimore Ravens. 

 Also on February 9, Michigan announced the hire of former Michigan player Grant Newsome as the program's tight ends coach, after previously spending two seasons as a graduate assistant with the program. 

 Harbaugh also announced a reassignment of numerous staff roles on February 9. Offensive line coach Sherrone Moore and quarterbacks coach Matt Weiss were named co-offensive coordinators, replacing Gattis. Safeties coach Ron Bellamy transitioned into the role of wide receivers coach. Running backs coach Mike Hart added the title of run game coordinator. Tight ends coach Jay Harbaugh will switch to the defensive side of the ball and coach safeties.

Recruiting

2022 recruiting class

Incoming transfers

Schedule

Rankings

Game summaries

Colorado State

Sources:

    
    
    
    
    
    
    
    
    

The Wolverines opened their 2022 season on September 3 against the Colorado State Rams. Before a crowd of 109,575 at Michigan Stadium, the Wolverines defeated the Rams, 51–7. 

On the opening drive of the game, Michigan failed to gain a first down and was forced to punt. On Michigan's second drive, quarterback Cade McNamara threw a bubble screen pass to Roman Wilson who caught the ball at the 36-yard line and ran 64 yards for the opening score. 
On the next Colorado State possession, Michigan safety Rod Moore intercepted a pass at midfield and returned it to the Colorado State 13-yard line. After taking over in the red zone, McNamara threw a pass that was initially ruled as an interception but that was ruled incomplete after an official review. Michigan settled for a 31-yard field goal by Jake Moody and led, 10–0, at the end of the first quarter.

In the second quarter, Michigan's fourth drive stalled at the eight-yard line, and Michigan again settled for a 26-yard field goal by Moody. After a quarterback sack, Michigan was forced to punt on its fifth possession. On its sixth possession, Michigan started with excellent field possession near midfield, and Blake Corum capped the drive with a seven-yard touchdown run. On Michigan's eighth possession of the first half, Michigan stalled at the 16-yard line, and for the third time in the half, settled for a field goal by Moody. Michigan led, 23–0, at halftime.

Colorado State took the second-half kickoff, and on fourth down, quarterback Clay Millen fumbled, and Michigan defensive back D.J. Turner recovered the loose ball and returned it 45 yards for a touchdown. On Michigan's first offensive possession of the second half, McNamara began the drive at quarterback, but J. J. McCarthy took over near midfield. With McCarthy in charge of the offense, freshman running back C. J. Stokes gained 19 yards on his first collegiate carry, and McCarthy then ran the remaining 20 yards for a touchdown. Michigan led, 37–0, at the end of the third quarter.

Michigan's first full drive with McCarthy at quarterback began at the Michigan 42-yard line. McCarthy carried the ball twice for gains of 19 and 12 yards. The drive concluded with a one-yard touchdown run early in the fourth quarter by Donovan Edwards. Colorado State responded with its only successful drive, scoring on a 34-yard touchdown pass from Millen to Tory Horton with 8:59 remaining in the game. Following the Colorado State touchdown, Alan Bowman took over at quarterback for Michigan, completing five of six passes. Bowman then gave way to fourth-string quarterback Alex Orji who ran four yards for Michigan's final touchdown with 1:41 remaining.

On defense, Michigan had seven quarterback sacks and 11 tackles for loss. The defense held Colorado State to 137 passing yards and 82 rushing yards. On offense, Michigan tallied 206 passing yards and 234 rushing yards. Cade McNamara completed nine of eighteen passes for 136 yards and one touchdown and had a quarterback rating of 39.7. McCarthy completed four of four attempts for 30 yards and a quarterback rating of 99.9. Blake Corum gained 76 rushing yards and a touchdown on 13 carries, and Donovan Edwards gained 64 yards and a touchdown on 12 carries.

Michigan's honorary captains for the game were CBS Sports analysts and Michigan alumni Dana Jacobson and Tracy Wolfson.

Hawaii

Sources:

    
    
    
    
    
    
    
    
    

On September 10, Michigan hosted Hawaii before a crowd of 110,012 at Michigan Stadium. The game was delayed by an hour due to a passing thunderstorm. The 9:01 p.m. kickoff was the latest in Michigan Stadium history. Due to the weather delay, the  tradition of running under the M Club banner was not followed for the first time in some 60 years.

Michigan won the game, 56–10. The game was the first start for quarterback J. J. McCarthy. On their opening possession, the Wolverines drove 66 yards in 36 seconds on a 24-yard run by Blake Corum and a 42-yard touchdown pass from McCarthy to Roman Wilson. On their second possession, the Wolverines scored on a 77-yard drive that featured a 31-yard pass from McCarthy to Ronnie Bell and five runs by Corum, including a one-yard touchdown run. Michigan began its third possession in Hawaii territory after A. J. Henning returned a punt 35 yards to the 43-yard line. The Wolverines drove 43 yards on three plays, capped by Roman Wilson's second touchdown of the quarter on a 21-yard run. Michigan led, 21–0, at the end of the first quarter.

In the second quarter, running back Donovan Edwards led a three-play, 59-yard touchdown drive. Edwards began the drive with a 25-yard run and then lined up wide to the right, covered by a linebacker, and caught a 33-yard pass at the Hawaii one-yard line. Edwards then ran one yard for the touchdown. On Michigan's next drive, Cade McNamara entered the game, and the drive stalled near midfield when McNamara was sacked – Hawaii's first sack of the season. McCarthy returned to the game for the final drive of the half with 2:06 remaining. McCarthy led a four-play, 52-yard drive, ending with a 17-yard touchdown pass to Cornelius Johnson. Michigan led, 42–0, at halftime. 

In the third quarter, Michigan failed to score on three drives with McNamara at quarterback. Two drives ended in punts, and the third ended with Virdel Edwards II intercepting a pass. Hawaii scored the only points of the third quarter on a 26-yard field goal by Matthew Shipley. 

Late in the third quarter, freshman Davis Warren entered the game as Michigan's quarterback. Warren led a 91-yard touchdown drive capped by a 15-yard touchdown run by C. J. Stokes. Hawaii responded with a 54-yard touchdown run by Tylan Hines. Warren then led the Wolverines on a 65-yard drive, concluding with a 38-yard touchdown run by Isaiah Gash. 

McCarthy completed 11 of 12 passes for 229 yards and three touchdowns with a quarterback rating of 99.2. Warren compiled a quarterback rating of 96.6 in his first game for Michigan. McNamara compiled a career-low quarterback rating of 1.8. On the ground, five Michigan players scored rushing touchdowns. Corum led the way with 88 rushing yards on nine carries. Stokes contributed 61 yards on eight carries, and Gash added 48 yards on three carries. The coaching staff reached deep into the roster in the second half, giving 96 players an opportunity to participate for at least one play.

Michigan scored 42 points in the first-half, the most points since scoring 43 points in the first-half against Rutgers in 2016. Michigan's offense recorded 410 total yards in the first-half, the fifth most total yards in a half in program history.

UConn

Sources:

    
    
    
    
    
    
    
    

On September 17, Michigan played its final non-conference game, defeating UConn, 59–0, before a crowd of 109,639 at Michigan Stadium. 

On the game's opening drive, Michigan drove 72 yards on four plays including a screen pass from J. J. McCarthy to Roman Wilson covering 38 yards and a 20-yard touchdown run by Blake Corum. Michigan's second drive resulted in a three-and-out. On their third possession, the Wolverines drove 54 yards on four plays, concluding with Corum's second touchdown on a one-yard run. After a fumble by UConn running back ictor Rosa, Michigan's fourth drive started at the Huskies' 25-yard line. Michigan advanced to the seven-yard line but settled for a 26-yard field goal by Jake Moody. The Wolverines led, 17–0, at the end of the first quarter.

Early in the second quarter, Michigan took over at the UConn 18-yard line after Caden Kolesar blocked a punt.  Corum scored his third touchdown on a one-yard run.  Michigan extended the lead with a 61-yard punt return for a touchdown. Later in the second quarter, Michigan drove 60 yards on three plays, including a 28-yard pass from McCarthy to Ronnie Bell, a 31-yard pass from McCarthy to Luke Schoonmaker, and a one-yard touchdown run by Corum (his fourth). On Michigan's final possession of the half, Cade McNamara entered the game at quarterback and sustained an injury after being tackled behind the line of scrimmage. With 24 seconds left in the half, Moody attempted a 62-yard field goal that fell short. Michigan led, 38–0, at halftime.

On Michigan's first drive of the second half, McCarthy led the team 83 yards on 11 plays, including a 17-yard pass to Roman Wilson and Corum's fifth touchdown on an 11-yard run. Michigan led, 45–0, at the end of the third quarter.

On Michigan's next drive, Davis Warren began the drive at quarterback and then gave way to Alex Orji. The team drove 66 yards on 11 plays, ending with a 10-yard run by Orji. Michigan's final touchdown drive covered 30 yards with Andy Maddox and then Alan Bowman at quarterback; the drive concluded with a 30-yard touchdown pass from Bowman to Leon Franklin.

Michigan had seven quarterbacks complete a pass in the game. McCarthy completed 15 of 18 passes for 214 yards. Corum tallied 71 rushing yards on 12 carries. Corum tied Michigan's modern-era record with five rushing touchdowns in a game. He became the first Michigan player to score four first-half touchdowns in a game since Ed Shuttlesworth in 1972.

Michigan won its third consecutive game to start the season by a margin of 40-plus points for the first time since 1991. Its 59-point margin of victory was the fifth highest for a Michigan team in the modern era.

Maryland

Sources:

    
    
    
    
    
    
    
    
    
    

On September 24, Michigan defeated Maryland, 34–27, before a homecoming crowd of 110,225 at Michigan Stadium. 

After Maryland fumbled the opening kickoff, Michigan took possession at Maryland's 10-yard line and scored on the first play from scrimmage, a 10-yard touchdown pass from J. J. McCarthy to Luke Schoonmaker. Maryland then drove 40 yards on 10 plays, settling for a 53-yard field goal by Chad Ryland. Michigan then drove 41 yards on 10 plays, also settling for a field goal of 52 yards by Jake Moody. Maryland then drove 75 yards on 13 plays, concluding with a two-yard touchdown run by Antwain Littleton. Michigan's third drive ended with a fumble by C. J. Stokes at Maryland's 27-yard line. The score was tied, 10–10, at the end of the first quarter.

Early in the second quarter, Maryland took a 13–10 lead on a 52-yard field goal by Chad Ryland. Later in the quarter, Moody missed on a 43-yard field goal attempt. With 1:14 left in the half, Michigan drove 70 yards on eight plays, ending with a 33-yard touchdown run by Blake Corum. Michigan led, 17–13, at halftime.

Neither team scored in the third quarter, as each team was forced to punt two times.

The teams combined for 31 points in a high-scoring fourth quarter. Late in the third and early in the fourth quarter, Michigan drove 84 yards in 10 plays, ending with a 20-yard touchdown pass from McCarthy to Roman Wilson. Maryland responded with a 75-yard drive, concluding with a four-yard touchdown pass from Taulia Tagovailoa to Tai Felton. Michigan then added a 38-yard field goal by Moody. After R.J. Moten intercepted a Tagovailoa pass, Michigan drove 65 yards, including a 47-yard touchdown run by Corum. On its final possession, Maryland drove 75 yards and scored on an 18-yard pass from Billy Edwards Jr. to CJ Dippre.

Blake Corum rushed for a career-high 243 yards and two touchdowns on 30 carries. His 243 rushing yards was the most for a Michigan player since Denard Robinson rushed for 258 yards in 2010. He leads the Wolverines all-time with 6.47 career yards per attempt, passing Jon Vaughn (6.29, 1989–90). 

J. J. McCarthy completed 18 of 26 passes for 220 yards, two touchdowns, and zero interceptions. Tight end Luke Schoonmaker caught a career-high seven passes for 72 yards and a touchdown.

at Iowa
 

Sources:

    
    
    
    
    
    

On October 1, in a rematch of the 2021 Big Ten Football Championship Game, Michigan defeated Iowa, 27–14, before a crowd of 69,250 at Kinnick Stadium in Iowa City, Iowa. The win was Michigan's first in Iowa City since a 23–20 overtime victory in 2005. In response to the pink paint in Kinnick Stadium's visitors locker room, the Wolverines embraced the color and waved bright pink towels on the sideline before the game started.

On the opening drive of the game, Michigan drove 75 yards on 11 plays, concluding with a 16-yard touchdown run by Ronnie Bell. Iowa and Michigan traded punts on the next three drives.

At the start of the second quarter, Michigan drove 54 yards, and Jake Moody kicked a 44-yard field goal. After forcing a third Iowa punt, Michigan drove 61 yards, and Moody kicked a 35-yard field goal. Michigan led, 13–0, at halftime.

Iowa took the second-half kickoff and was held to negative yardage and a three-and-out. Michigan then drove 67 yards on 10 plays, J. J. McCarthy passing for 12 yards to Donovan Edwards for a touchdown. The teams traded punts on the next two drives, and Michigan led, 20–0, at the end of third quarter.

On the first play of the fourth quarter, Iowa scored on a two-yard touchdown run by Kaleb Johnson, capping a seven-play, 44-yard drive. Iowa was held on downs on its next to drives, and Michigan punted on consecutive three-and-outs. With 2:10 remaining in the game, Michigan took over on downs at the Iowa 28-yard line. Blake Corum ran three times, scoring on a 20-yard run. With 1:11 remaining in the game, Spencer Petras led the Hawkeyes on a five-play, 75-yard drive. Petras threw a five-yard touchdown pass to Luke Lachey with eight seconds remaining in the game.

McCarthy completed 18 of 24 passes for 155 yards and a touchdown. Corum rushed for 133 yards and a touchdown. Tight end Luke Schoonmaker led Michigan's receivers with four catches for 45 yards. On defense, Michigan held Iowa to 35 rushing yards. Petras completed 21 of 31 passes for 246 yards and a touchdown.

at Indiana

Sources:

    
    
    
    
    
    

On October 8, Michigan defeated Indiana, 31–10, before a crowd of 50,805 at Memorial Stadium in Bloomington, Indiana. 

On the opening drive of the game, Blake Corum ran 50 yards to the one-yard line and then scored on a one-yard touchdown. This marked the fifth time in six games that Michigan scored on its first possession of the game. After an exchange of punts, Indiana drove 76 yards and tied the game on an 11-yard touchdown pass from Connor Bazelak to Josh Henderson. Michigan responded with a 49-yard drive ending with a 44-yard field goal by Jake Moody. Michigan led, 10–7, at the end of the first quarter. 

Late in the first and early in the second quarter, Indiana drove 52 yards on 12 plays, tying the score on a 41-yard field goal by Charles Campbell. Late in the second quarter, the teams blocked field goals on consecutive possessions, with Indiana blocking a Jake Moody attempt at a 26-yarder and Michigan's Mike Morris blocking a 24-yard attempt by Charles Campbell. An Indiana touchdown was taken off the board due to an illegal block prior to Indiana's attempted field goal. The score was tied, 10–10, at halftime. 

On its first possession of the second half, Michigan drove 98 yards on 11 plays, concluding with a 29-yard touchdown pass from J. J. McCarthy to Cornelius Johnson. Late in the third quarter, McCarthy was intercepted by Devon Matthews in the end zone for a touchback. Michigan led, 17–10, at the end of the third quarter.

In the fourth quarter, Michigan drove 56 yards, scoring on a nine-yard touchdown pass from McCarthy to Luke Schoonmaker. Michigan next drove 60 yards, scoring on a six-yard touchdown pass from McCarthy to Johnson.

Michigan's defense forced Indiana to punt on its first five possessions of the second half before forcing a turnover on downs with under two minutes to play. They also forced 10 tackles-for-loss, seven sacks and held Indiana to 29 yards in the second half. Corum finished with 124 yards rushing on 25 carries, his third consecutive 100-yard rushing game. McCarthy set career-best marks in pass attempts (28), completions (36) and passing yards (304), his first 300-yard game as a Wolverine. McCarthy threw his first career interception, ending a streak of 129 consecutive pass attempts without an interception.

No. 10 Penn State
 

Sources:

    
    
    
    
    
    
    
    
    
    

On October 16, No. 5 Michigan defeated No. 10 Penn State, 41–17, before a crowd of 110,812 at Michigan Stadium.

On the opening drive of the game, Michigan drove 64 yards to the Penn State 11-yard line, and Jake Moody kicked a 29-yard field goal. After holding Penn State to a three-and-out, Michigan drove 77 yards on its second drive, including a 35-yard gain on a pass from J. J. McCarthy to Cornelius Johnson. Michigan settled for its second field goal, a 24-yarder by Moody. Michigan's defense again held Penn State to a three-and-out on the Nittany Lions' second possession to conclude the first quarter.

On its third possession, Michigan drove 70 yards, ending with a one-yard touchdown run by Blake Corum. On Penn State's third possession, Sean Clifford faked a handoff, kept the ball, and ran 62 yards to the Michigan four-yard line. Kaytron Allen then ran one yard for Penn State's first and only offensive touchdown of the game. On Michigan's fourth possession, Curtis Jacobs intercepted a McCarthy pass and returned it 47 yards for Penn State's second touchdown in a span of less than two minutes. On their fifth possession, the Wolverines drove 60 yards, and Moody kicked a 23-yard field goal with two seconds remaining in the half. Michigan led, 16–14, at halftime.

On the opening drive of the second half, Penn State drove 70 yards, including a pass from Clifford to Harrison Wallace III for 48 yards. The Nittany Lions retook the lead as Jake Pinegar kicked a 27-yard field goal. On its first possession of the second half, Michigan drove 81 yards, including a 67-yard touchdown run by Donovan Edwards. McCarthy completed a pass to Ronnie Bell for a two-point conversion. After holding Penn State on downs, Corum ran 61 yards for a touchdown on Michigan's second drive of the second half.

In the fourth quarter, Michigan added 10 points on a 37-yard field goal by Moody and a three-yard touchdown run by Edwards.

Michigan tallied 418 rushing yards in the game, the highest single-game rushing total for Michigan since 2016. Edwards led the way with a career-high 173 yards and two touchdowns, and Corum tallied 166 yards and two touchdowns. McCarthy completed 17 of 24 passes for 145 yards and an interception. Johnson led Michigan's receivers with 43 receiving yards on three receptions.  Playing in his 53rd game for the Wolverines (ranking second in Michigan history), Moody converted all four of his field goal attempts. Michigan did not punt in the game. The Wolverines dominated time of possession, holding the ball for 41:56 to 18:04 for Penn State.

On defense, Michigan limited Penn State to 111 rushing yards, of which 62 yards came on Clifford's 62-yard sprint in the second quarter. Clifford and freshman Drew Allar combined for 157 passing yards for Penn State.

During the game, Michigan celebrated the 25th anniversary of the 1997 national championship team and dedicated the Michigan Stadium tunnel as the "Lloyd Carr Michigan Stadium Tunnel." Aidan Hutchinson was also presented with the Lott Trophy for 2022. Swimmer Michael Phelps and U.S. representative Fred Upton were honorary captains for Michigan.

Michigan State

Sources:

    
    
    
    
    
    
    

On October 29, after a bye week, No. 4 Michigan defeated rival Michigan State, 29–7, in a night game at Michigan Stadium. The Wolverines regained custody of the Paul Bunyan Trophy, ending the Spartans' two-game winning streak in the rivalry.

On the opening drive, Michigan State advanced the ball 29 yards on its first three plays, but penalties for unsportsmanlike conduct and false start stopped the drive. On Michigan's first possession, the Wolverines drove 33 yards, but Cornelius Johnson fumbled and the loose ball was recovered for the Spartans by Dashaun Mallory. Michigan State was then stopped on a fourth-and-one play, and the Wolverines took over at their own 46-yard line. Michigan then drove 41 yards on eight plays, including a 28-yard gain on a pass from J. J. McCarthy to Donovan Edwards. The drive stalled at the five-yard line, and Jake Moody kicked a 22-yard field goal. The Spartans responded with a six-play, 75-yard drive, capped by a 26-yard touchdown pass from Payton Thorne to Keon Coleman. Michigan State led, 7–3, at the end of the first quarter.

Early in the second quarter, Michigan retook the lead with an 80-yard drive, ending with a two-yard touchdown pass from McCarthy to Blake Corum. The Spartans responded with a 68-yard drive, including two long completions  from Thorne to Coleman, but Michigan's defense held on a fourth-and-and one play at Michigan's five-yard line. Michigan then had an 86-yard, 15-play drive that consumed six minutes and 23 seconds, ending with a 25-yard field goal by Moody. Michigan led, 13–7, at halftime.

Michigan took the kickoff to start the second half and drove 57 yards, settling for a career-long 54-yard field goal by Moody. After holding the Spartans to a three-and-out, the Wolverines drove 54 yards and settled for Moody's fourth field goal, a 33-yarder.

Early in the fourth quarter, Michigan's defense held, and the Spartans' long snap was too high for the punter to handle. Michigan took over at the Spartans' eight-yard line and scored on a four-yard touchdown run by Corum. Michigan's defense then held the Spartans to eight yards and a punt.

Corum led the team on offense with 177 rushing yards on 33 caries, his fifth consecutive 100-yard rushing game; he had two touchdowns, one rushing and one receiving. McCarthy completed 15 of 25 passes for 167 yards and a touchdown. Luke Schoonmaker led the receiving corps with five receptions for 70 yards. Jack Moody was successful on all five field goal attempts and accounted for 17 of Michigan's 29 points. Michigan's only punt of the game came with 5:52 remaining in the fourth quarter.

On defense, the Wolverines held the Spartans to 37 rushing yards, and forced the Spartans into three consecutive three-and-outs to begin the second half and allowed just three Spartans first downs in the entire second half. Coleman caught five passes for 155 yards and a touchdown for the Spartans. Todays game marked the 600th in the history of Michigan Stadium.

Melee in the tunnel
After the game, an incident broke out in the Michigan Stadium tunnel. Several Michigan State players allegedly assaulted Michigan defensive backs Gemon Green and JaDen McBurrows. Chris Solari of the Detroit Free Press was present and reported that he saw Michigan State players punching, shoving and kicking McBurrows. McBurrows reportedly sustained a nose injury. Green was struck by a helmet swung by a Michigan State player, reportedly sustained a concussion and facial cuts, and hired attorney Tom Mars to file a lawsuit for assault.

Reaction to the incident was swift. In his postgame news conference, Jim Harbaugh described the incident as a "10 on 1, pretty bad," and noted that one of the players sustained a "nasal injury." Bob Wojnowski of The Detroit News described it as a "brutal attack" and condemned the actions of the Michigan State players as "profound cowardice."

Michigan State coach Mel Tucker tweeted the next morning: "While emotions were very high at the conclusion of our rivalry game at Michigan Stadium, there is no excuse for behavior that puts our team or our opponents at risk." On the Sunday evening after the game, Tucker announced the suspension of four players: Angelo Grose, Zion Young, Itayvion "Tank" Brown, and Khary Crump. On November 1, Michigan State suspended four additional players: Malcolm Jones, Justin White, Jacoby Windmon and Brandon Wright. On November 23, criminal charges for felonious assault, aggravated assault, or assault and battery were filed against seven Michigan State players in connection with the tunnel incident. On November 28, following the Big Ten's investigation, it was announced that the Spartans were fined $100,000 and Khary Crump was suspended for the first eight games of the 2023 season.  On December 24, a plea deal was announced and on January 5, 2023, Khary Crump will plead guilty to misdemeanor counts of assault/battery and disorderly conduct person-jostling.

at Rutgers

Sources: 

    
    
    
    
    
    
    
    
    
    

On November 5, Michigan defeated Rutgers, 52–17, at SHI Stadium in Piscataway, New Jersey. 

On the opening drive of the game, Michigan drove 75 yards in 12 plays, ending with a one-yard touchdown run by Blake Corum. On Michigan's second possession, Rutgers blocked a Michigan punt, and Timmy Ward recovered the loose ball and returned it seven yards for a touchdown. After its touchdown, Rutgers attempted an on-side kick, but Michigan recovered the ball at midfield. The Wolverines then drove 50 yards on six plays with J. J. McCarthy carrying the ball one yard for a touchdown. Michigan led, 14-7, at the end of the first quarter.

Jude McAtamney of Rutgers kicked a 32-yard field goal early in the second quarter. The teams exchanged punts on the next two drives, and Jake Moody missed on a 50-yard field goal attempt with 4:42 remaining in the first half. After the missed field goal, Rutgers drove 68 yards on eight plays, including a 48-yard pass from Gavin Wimsatt to Chris Long and ending with a three-yard touchdown pass from Wimsatt to Sean Ryan. Rutgers led, 17–14, at halftime.

Rutgers was held scoreless and gained only 57 yards of total offense in the second half. On their first possession of the third quarter, Michigan drove 53 yards on eight plays, ending with a 14-yard touchdown pass from McCarthy to Donovan Edwards at the 8:24 mark. Michigan's second drive of the quarter started at Rutger's 10-yard line following Michael Barrett's interception of a Wimsatt pass. Corum scored on a two-yard touchdown run at the 6:53 mark. On Rutgers' next possession, Barrett intercepted another Wimsatt pass and returned it 31 yards for a touchdown at the 6:42 mark. Michigan tallied 21 points in less than a minute-and-a-half of game time. Later in the third quarter, Will Johnson intercepted a Wimsatt pass, and Michigan took over at Rutgers' 31-yard line. After a 28-yard run by Corum, Cornelius Johnson scored on a six-yard touchdown pass from McCarthy. Michigan led, 38–14, at the end of the third quarter.

Early in the fourth quarter, Michigan drove 61 yards on eight run plays by Davis Warren, scoring on a 29-yard field goal by Jake Moody. Later in the quarter, the Wolverines drove 58 yards on eight plays by C.J. Stokes, Davis Warren, Tavierre Dunlap, and Isaiah Gash. The drive ended with a four-yard touchdown run by Gash with 3:23 remaining in the game.

Michigan's honorary captain for the game was film director Spike Lee. Blake Corum scored two touchdowns and rushed for 109 yards, his sixth consecutive 100-yard rushing game. With his third-quarter extra point, kicker Jake Moody became the fifth player in Michigan history to reach 300 career points.

Nebraska

Sources: 

    
    
    
    
    
    

On November 12, Michigan defeated Nebraska, 34–3, in front of a crowd of 110,912 at Michigan Stadium. 

After the opening kickoff, Nebraska drove to Michigan's 35-yard line, but a false start penalty and a sack by Junior Colson pushed the Cornhuskers back to the 41-yard line where they were forced to punt. The Wolverines took over at the 20-yard line and drove 80 yards on 12 plays, finally scoring on a two-yard run by Blake Corum. The teams traded punts on the next five possessions. Michigan led, 7–0, at the end of the first quarter.

With 8:46 remaining in the second quarter, J. J. McCarthy threw a nine-yard touchdown pass to Ronnie Bell to cap a 66-yard drive. Nebraska responded with a 56-yard drive that included a pass to Alante Brown in which Brown tried to hurdle over Mike Sainristil, but Sainristil jumped as well, his helmet striking Brown between his legs, causing Brown to tumble head first to the ground. Nebraska's drive ended with a 37-yard field goal by Timmy Bleekrode. Late in the second quarter, Michigan drove 55 yards on 12 plays, and Jake Moody kicked a 30-yard field goal with one second remaining. Michigan led, 17–3, at halftime.

Michigan held Nebraska to 43 yards of offense and zero points in the second half. On Michigan's second possession of the half, they drove 65 yards on 10 plays and scored on a three-yard touchdown run by McCarthy. In the fourth quarter, Michigan extended its lead with a 76-yard touchdown drive ending with a 29-yard pass from McCarthy to Bell; Bell fumbled the ball into the end zone and Andrel Anthony recovered the ball for a touchdown before it bounced out of bounds. Michigan concluded the scoring with 4:35 remaining on a 43-yard field goal by Moody.

Michigan out-gained Nebraska by a total of 412 yards to 146, as the Cornhuskers reached the red zone only once. Corum led the way on offense for Michigan, totaling 162 rushing yards on 28 carries. McCarthy completed eight of 17 passes for 129 yards and two touchdowns. Moody's first-quarter extra point gave him 100 for the season, becoming the third player in Michigan history to record consecutive seasons with 100-plus points, following Anthony Thomas (1999–2000) and Tom Harmon (1939–40).

Illinois

Sources: 

    
    
    
    
    
    
    

On November 19, Michigan came from behind with three fourth-quarter field goals to defeat Illinois by a 19–17 before a crowd of 110,433 at Michigan Stadium. 

On the opening possession, Michigan drove 75 yards on seven plays, scoring on a two-yard touchdown run by Blake Corum. Over the next four possessions, neither team scored. Late in the second quarter, Illinois drove 59 yards, and Caleb Griffith kicked a 29-yard field goal. Shortly before the end of the half, Michigan drove 62 yards to the Illinois 17-yard line, but turned the ball over on a fumble by Corum at the 13-yard line. Corum injured his knee on the play. Michigan led, 7–3, at halftime. 

On the opening drive of the second half, Illinois was held to a three-and-out. After a short 22-yard punt by Hugh Robertson, Michigan drove 24 yards to Illinois 28-yard line, and Jake Moody kicked a 46-yard field goal. Illinois then took the lead with touchdowns on its next two drives; Chase Brown scored on runs of eight and 37 yards. Illinois led, 17–10, at the end of the third quarter, marking the first time Michigan trailed in the second half of a game to that point in the season. 

Michigan scored nine points in the fourth quarter on three field goals by Moody from 41 yards, 33 yards, and 35 yards, respectively.

Corum rushed for 108 yards during the first half of the game, before leaving the game due to injury. This was his eighth consecutive 100-yard rushing game, the longest streak by a Wolverine since Mike Hart in 2007. Corum surpassed Tony Boles (1,408 yards, 1988) to reach the top ten all-time in single-season rushing yards.

at No. 2 Ohio State

Sources: 

    
    
    
    
    
    
    
    
    
    
    

On November 26, Michigan (ranked No. 3) defeated rival Ohio State (ranked No. 2), 45–23, before a crowd of 106,787 at Ohio Stadium in Columbus, Ohio. With the victory, Michigan won the Big Ten East Division championship and improved to 12–0 for the first time since 1997.

Ohio State opened the game with a 12-play, 81-yard touchdown drive, scoring on a four-yard touchdown pass from C. J. Stroud to Emeka Egbuka. Michigan responded with a 44-yard, 10-play drive, including a 33-yard pass from J. J. McCarthy to Ronnie Bell, and ending with a 49-yard field goal by Jake Moody. On their second possession, the Buckeyes drove 58 yards on 10 plays, and Noah Ruggles kicked a 32-yard field goal with 1:19 remaining in the first quarter. Ohio State led, 10–3, at the end of the first quarter.

Halfway through the second quarter, J. J. McCarthy connected with Cornelius Johnson on a sideline out pass; Johnson broke a tackle, and ran for a touchdown, the play covering 69 yards. Ohio State responded with a 47-yard field goal by Ruggles to regain the lead. Michigan took the lead with a second long touchdown pass from McCarthy to Johnson, this one down the middle of the field covering 75 yards. Ohio State then drove 79 yards on four plays, ending with a 42-yard touchdown pass from Stroud to Marvin Harrison Jr. The half ended with three consecutive three-and-outs, two by Michigan and one by Ohio State. The Buckeyes led, 20–17, at halftime.

Michigan took the second-half kickoff and drove 75 yards on seven plays, including a 19-yard run by McCarthy and culminating with a 45-yard touchdown pass from McCarthy to freshman tight end Colston Loveland. The defenses dominated the balance of the third quarter as Ohio State punted twice and Michigan once. Michigan led, 24–20, at the end of the third quarter.

Michigan extended its lead early in the fourth quarter on a three-yard touchdown run by McCarthy, culminating a 15-play, 81-yard drive that consumed 7:51 off the clock. On Michigan's next possession, Moody missed a 57-yard field goal attempt. Ohio State then drove 52 yards to the Michigan nine-yard line. On third-and-four from the nine-yard line, Stroud threw a pass that landed in the hands of Cade Stover in the end zone, but Mike Sainristil knocked the ball from Stovers' hand, and the Buckeyes settled for a 27-yard field goal by Ruggles. On the next play from scrimmage after the field goal, Donovan Edwards, wearing a cast on his right hand, scored on a 75-yard touchdown run down the right sideline with 7:11 remaining in the game. Ohio State then drove 59 yards to Michigan's 16-yard line. On third down from the 16-yard line, Stroud tossed a shovel pass that was intercepted by Taylor Upshaw at the eight-yard line. Edwards then scored on his second long run of the quarter, this time for 85 yards. With 1:48 remaining in the game, Makari Paige intercepted a Stroud pass, and Michigan was able to run out the clock.

At the end of the game, Michigan defensive back Mike Sainristil planted a "Block M" flag in the "O" logo in the middle of the field. The victory gave Michigan consecutive victories over Ohio State for the first time since the 1999 and 2000 seasons.  It was also Michigan's first victory at Ohio Stadium since 2000.  McCarthy became the first quarterback in program history to begin his career with at least 11 wins as a starter before taking his first loss, surpassing the previous record of 10 set by Dennis Franklin in 1972.

vs Purdue

Sources: 

    
    
    
    
    
    
    
    
    
    
    

On December 3, having won the Big Ten East championship, Michigan played Big Ten West champion Purdue in the Big Ten Championship Game at Lucas Oil Stadium in Indianapolis. The Wolverines defeated the Boilermakers, 43–22. It was Michigan's second consecutive appearance (and second consecutive victory) in the championship game and the first appearance for Purdue.

After holding Purdue to a three-and-out following the opening kickoff, Michigan drove 55 yards on seven plays, scoring on a 25-yard pass from J. J. McCarthy to Colston Loveland. Purdue responded with a 10-play, 92-yard drive on which Aidan O'Connell completed all six of his passes; the drive ended with a one-yard touchdown run by Devin Mockobee. The score was tied, 7–7, at the end of the first quarter.

On a drive that began late in the first quarter, Purdue went 46 yards on 11 plays, and Mitchell Fineran kicked a 33-yard field goal to give Purdue a 10–7 lead. Michigan responded with a 13-play, 75-yard drive that included a fourth-down conversion on a two-yard run by Kalel Mullings and ended with a seven-yard touchdown pass from McCarthy to Luke Schoonmaker. Purdue then drove 47 yards in 13 plays, and Fineran kicked a 45-yard field goal. Michigan led, 14–13, at halftime.

Following the second-half kickoff, Michigan drove 75 yards on five plays, including a 60-yard run by Donovan Edwards and a one-yard touchdown run by Mullings – Mullings' first collegiate touchdown. Michigan held Purdue to a three-and-out and then drove 67 yards on two plays: a 40-yard pass from McCarthy to Schoonmaker and a 27-yard touchdown run by Edwards. Later in the quarter, Fineran kicked his third field goal, this one from 43 yards. Michigan led, 28–19, at the end of the third quarter.

With 1:35 remaining in the third quarter, Purdue's Jamari Bown intercepted a pass by McCarthy – breaking McCarthy's streak of 148 straight attempts without an interception. Purdue then drove 66 yards, but settled for its fourth field goal, a 27-yarder with 12:37 remaining in the game. With 9:57 remaining, Michigan cornerback Will Johnson recorded his second interception of the game at the Purdue 16-yard line. Michigan scored on a 17-yard pass from McCarthy to Ronnie Bell. McCarthy threw a pass to Schoonmaker for a two-point conversion. Purdue then drove 60 yards but settled for a 32-yard field goal by Fineran.  In the closing minutes of the game, Michigan recovered an on-side kick and drove 44 yards with Mullings scoring on a three-yard touchdown run.

The victory gave Michigan the first 13-win season in program history and consecutive conference titles for the first time since the 1991 and 1992 seasons. Donovan Edwards finished the game with 25 carries for 185 yards and a touchdown and was selected as the game's most valuable player. J. J. McCarthy completed 11 of 17 passes for 161 yards, three touchdowns and an interception. Kalel Mullings had eight carries for 26 yards and two touchdowns. The victory also gave McCarthy a 12–0 record, the most wins in Michigan history to begin a starting quarterback's career.

vs. No. 3 TCU

Sources: 

    
    
    
    
    
    
    
    
    
    
    
    
    
    
    

In the final College Football Playoff rankings of the year announced on December 4, Michigan (13–0) was ranked second, earning their second playoff bid and a spot in the semifinal game to be played at the 2022 Fiesta Bowl against TCU (12–1).

Michigan lost to TCU 45–51. TCU scored 14 points in the first quarter via a 41-yard interception return by Bud Clark and a one-yard touchdown run by Max Duggan. Michigan finally got on the board in the second quarter via a 42-yard field goal by Jake Moody. TCU extended their lead via a six-yard touchdown pass from Duggan to Taye Barber. Michigan responded with a 59-yard field goal by Moody as time expired in the half, which made the score 21–6 in favor of TCU at halftime. The 59-yard field goal by Moody set the program record for longest field goal made at, surpassing the previous record of 57-yards held by Quinn Nordin and Hayden Epstein. TCU scored 20 points in the third quarter via a one-yard touchdown run by Emari Demercado, a 29-yard interception return by Dee Winters, and a one-yard touchdown run by Duggan. Michigan scored 24 points in the quarter via a 21-yard field goal by Moody, a 34-yard touchdown pass from J. J. McCarthy to Ronnie Bell, a 20-yard touchdown run by McCarthy and a one-yard touchdown run by Kalel Mullings. TCU scored 10 points in the fourth quarter via a 76-yard touchdown pass from Duggan to Quentin Johnston and a 33-yard field goal by Griffin Kell. Michigan scored 15 points in the quarter via an 18-yard touchdown run by Roman Wilson and a five-yard touchdown pass from McCarthy to Wilson.

With Moody's field goal in the second quarter, he broke Desmond Howard's single-season scoring record (138 points) set in 1991, and finished with 147 points during the season. Moody finished his career with 355 points, setting a new all-time Michigan scoring record, surpassing the previous record of 354 points set by Garrett Rivas.

Roster

Awards and honors

Statistics

Offensive statistics

Defensive statistics

Special teams statistics

References

Michigan
Michigan Wolverines football seasons
Big Ten Conference football champion seasons
Michigan Wolverines football